The National Agri-Marketing Association (NAMA) is a non-profit organization of more than 3,500 professional and student members, serving the food and fiber industry. NAMA provides access to solutions and opportunities in agribusiness.

References

Trade associations based in the United States
Agricultural organizations based in the United States